Wilma Elizabeth Forster (née Oram) Young  (17 August 1916 – 28 May 2001) was an Australian Army nurse during the Second World War. She was evacuated from Singapore in February 1942 and was aboard the Vyner Brooke when the ship was sunk in Bangka Strait by Japanese aircraft. After surviving in the water for many hours she came ashore at Bangka Island and became a prisoner of war (POW) until 1945. Vivian Bullwinkel and Betty Jeffrey were captives together with Oram.

Following the war she married Alan Livingstone Young, who had also been a prisoner of war. They settled on a dairy farm at Cardinia in Victoria and had 4 children. Aside from her work on the farm she was an active member of the Returned and Services League of Australia, serving as the treasurer and later president of its Pakenham branch. She worked for causes including greater recognition for Vietnam War veterans and to raise money for the Australian Service Nurses National Memorial, unveiled in Canberra on 2 October 1999.

References
 A Woman's War: the exceptional life of Wilma Oram Young, AM, Barbara Angell, New Holland Publishers (Australia) Pty Ltd, Sydney, 2003.
 Victorians at War 
 Australian Women's Register

1916 births
2001 deaths
Female wartime nurses
Military history of Australia during World War II
Australian military personnel of World War II
Women in World War II
Women in the Australian military
People from Victoria (Australia)
World War II prisoners of war held by Japan
Members of the Order of Australia
World War II nurses
Australian military nurses
Australian prisoners of war
Australian women nurses
20th-century Australian women